Apne Paraye is a 1980 Indian Hindi-language drama film directed by Basu Chatterjee and produced by Mushir Alam. It stars Amol Palekar and Shabana Azmi in pivotal roles. It is based on the 1917 Bengali novel, Nishkriti by Sarat Chandra Chattopadhyay

Ashalata, who made her Hindi film debut with the film, was nominated for the Filmfare Award for Best Supporting Actress.

Plot

This is a tale of family dynamics of a joint family.

Cast
 Amol Palekar...Chandranath
 Shabana Azmi...Sheila
 Girish Karnad...Harish
 Utpal Dutt...Advocate
 Ashalata Wabgaonkar...Sidheshwari 
 Bharati Achrekar...Naintara
 Raadhika....Leela

Soundtrack
The music of the film was composed by Bappi Lahiri, while lyrics were penned by Yogesh.

References

External links

1980s Hindi-language films
Indian drama films
1980 films
Films based on Indian novels
Films based on works by Sarat Chandra Chattopadhyay
Films set in Kolkata
Films directed by Basu Chatterjee
Films scored by Bappi Lahiri
1980 drama films